Time to Rock da Show is the second extended play by the South Korean girl group Rania. It was released on November 17, 2011. The song "Pop Pop Pop" was used to promote the EP. It was the last EP to feature member Joy.

Release 
The full mini-album was released on November 16, 2011. Promotions for "Pop Pop Pop" began on November 17, 2011, on M! Countdown.

Track listing

Charts

Singles chart

References 

2011 EPs
Rania (band) albums